Willis Herschel "Mule" Stockton (December 29, 1913 in Abilene, Texas – November 1965) was an American football player for the Philadelphia Eagles.

Stockton attended McMurry University.  He played at guard for the Eagles in the 1937 and 1938 seasons.

Stockton was elected to the McMurry Hall of Fame in 1984.

References

 Herschel Stockton statistics at databasefootball.com

1913 births
1965 deaths
Philadelphia Eagles players
McMurry University alumni